Jo Allen is an English make-up artist. She is best known for her make-up work in Gladiator, The Hours and The Sea Inside.

Awards and nominations
Her work in The Sea Inside (2004) earned her a Goya Award for Best Make-Up and Hairstyles, as well as an Academy Award for Best Makeup.

She was also nominated for a BAFTA for her prosthetic work on Nicole Kidman and Julianne Moore on The Hours.

Filmography

Makeup Department

References

External links
 

American make-up artists
Living people
Year of birth missing (living people)
Place of birth missing (living people)